Karaula may refer to:

 Karaula (film) or The Border Post, a 2006 Serbo-Croatian film
 Karaula (Ilijaš), a village in Bosnia and Herzegovina
 Karaula (Kakanj), a village in Bosnia and Herzegovina
 Karaula (Prijepolje), a village in Serbia